Tamio Dejima (born 21 February 1947) is a Japanese speed skater. He competed in the men's 500 metres event at the 1968 Winter Olympics.

References

1947 births
Living people
Japanese male speed skaters
Olympic speed skaters of Japan
Speed skaters at the 1968 Winter Olympics
People from Nagano (city)
20th-century Japanese people